The Mumbai Television Tower, also known as the Worli Doordarshan Tower, is the television tower owned by Doordarshan, the public-broadcaster located in the city of Mumbai in India. The red and white tower is an open latticework structure. The tower, located at Worli, can be seen from most parts of South Mumbai.

A 32-minute documentary titled Tale of a Tower was produced by the Films Division of India featuring footage of the tower topped out in 1972.

See also 
 Lattice tower
 List of tallest freestanding structures in the world
 List of tallest freestanding steel structures

References

External links 
 Information on the completed 300m Mumbai TV Tower at Emporis.com
 Drawings of Mumbai TV Tower - SkyscraperPage.com

Towers completed in 1972
Communication towers in India
Lattice towers
1972 establishments in Maharashtra
Buildings and structures in Mumbai
20th-century architecture in India